The 1993 Houston Oilers season was the team's 34th, and their 24th in the National Football League (NFL).

The 1993 Oilers season is widely regarded as one of the most notorious and turbulent seasons in NFL history, both on and off the field. Before the season began, owner Bud Adams told the team that unless the Oilers made the Super Bowl, he would break up the team. Despite their poor start (four losses in their first five games), the Oilers went on a remarkable 11–0 run to finish the 1993 season, ending up tied for the best record in the NFL, and the best record in franchise history, at 12–4. Houston earned the #2 seed in the playoffs, and a first round bye. The 11-game winning streak was the longest in the NFL since 1972. 

Statistics site Football Outsiders calculates that the Oilers were the hottest team in the NFL heading into the playoffs at the end of the 1993 season.

Despite the winning streak, first-round bye and playing in front of a home crowd, the Oilers were upset by Joe Montana and the Kansas City Chiefs at the Astrodome during the Divisional Round of the playoffs.

The 2006 edition of Pro Football Prospectus, listed the 1993 Oilers as one of their "Heartbreak Seasons", in which teams "dominated the entire regular season only to falter in the playoffs, unable to close the deal." Said Pro Football Prospectus, "Early in 1993, the Oilers seemed unable to put "The Comeback" behind them, dropping four of their first five games. But Houston righted the ship and ran the table, winning its final 11 contests. ... The Oilers allowed 20 points only once during the streak, and in one game held the league-leading 49ers offense to 7 points.

"In their first playoff game", Pro Football Prospectus continued, "they faced Joe Montana's Kansas City Chiefs, a team Houston had beaten 30–0 during the regular season. The Oilers jumped out to an early 10–0 lead, but stalled; leading 13–7 in the fourth quarter, they collapsed, losing 28–20. The team that had played eleven straight games while holding opponents to 20 points or less gave up 21 in the fourth quarter of a playoff game." True to his word, Bud Adams dismantled the team that off-season. Quarterback Warren Moon was shipped to Minnesota, and the Oilers fell to 2–14 the following year. By 1995, there was talk of the team leaving Houston for Nashville. The 1993 season was later covered in the "Houston '93" episode of the NFL Films documentary series A Football Life.

Season Review

"Babygate"
One bizarre sidelight to the season for Houston came just before the October 17 game vs. the New England Patriots. The day before, Oilers offensive tackle David Williams' wife Debi went into labor that Saturday but the baby was not born yet and Williams was unable to catch a flight, causing him to miss the game. Williams was fined $111,111 by the Oilers for missing the game and criticized by owner Bud Adams for "misplaced priorities", a move that led to intense criticism of the Oilers from fans and even players such as defensive end Sean Jones.

Buddy Ryan, Kevin Gilbride Conflict
New defensive coordinator Buddy Ryan and offensive coordinator Kevin Gilbride did not get along at all; Ryan's autonomy with the defense as promised by head coach Jack Pardee (granted in the aftermath of Houston's historic collapse in the previous season playoff loss in Buffalo) and loyalty amongst his players and coaches led to clashes with Gilbride, who was angered by cheap shots the defense regularly inflicted on the offense during practices. Ryan had been criticizing Gilbride's "run and shoot" offense, referring to it as the "chuck and duck." Ryan's own rage grew when two of his players were hurt after going back into games when the offense could have simply just run the ball and killed the clock, but were not able to because of problems the Oilers had using conventional running plays.

At the end of the first half in the final game of the season, a national broadcast against the New York Jets, Gilbride called a pass play, and when Cody Carlson was sacked and fumbled, Ryan started yelling at Gilbride, who started walking towards Ryan, yelling back. When they were in arms length, Ryan threw a glancing punch at Gilbride, who was ready to hit Ryan in return but slightly lost his balance and was then blocked from doing so as two players quickly separated them. Gilbride wanted to physically pay Buddy back for the cheap shot but several players on both offense and defense begged him to not do so because they were winning a key game. Gilbride reluctantly agreed, and ignored Buddy for the rest of the season and reportedly never spoke to him again.  Buddy Ryan would become the Arizona Cardinals head coach after the season.

Gay teammates
In 2013, former teammates on the 1993 team said that at least two key players on their roster were generally known by the team to be gay, and were accepted by the team.  It confirmed a rumor that had been hinted since that season, but had never been confirmed; had the rumours been proven in 1993, during an era of heightened stigma in the United States towards the HIV/AIDS epidemic compared to today and a mere two years after NBA superstar Magic Johnson's high-profile retirement upon being diagnosed with the disease, it would have almost certainly been the most controversial story of an already turbulent season for the Oilers. Teammate Bubba McDowell said showering with the gay teammates was "no big deal."  Lamar Lathon added that he had "never seen tougher guys than those guys."

Jeff Alm's suicide
Late in the season, the Oilers suffered the loss of reserve defensive lineman Jeff Alm, who had played two games earlier in the season and was due back soon after rehabilitating a broken leg. On December 13, 1993, Alm and his best friend, Sean P. Lynch, were in an accident that consisted of Alm losing control of his Cadillac Eldorado, sending Lynch flying out of the car and killing him near the 610 and Highway 59 interchange. Both Alm and Lynch were intoxicated at the time of the crash after spending a night on the town, and the latter was not wearing a seatbelt while in the car. After seeing his friend was dead, Alm called 9-1-1 and then committed suicide with a shotgun he kept in the trunk of his car. In memory of Alm, his number was worn as a decal on his teammates' helmets and his locker remained untouched for the rest of the season.

Offseason

NFL Draft

Personnel

Staff

Roster

Regular season

Schedule

Standings

Playoffs

AFC Divisional Playoff
AFC: Kansas City Chiefs 28, Houston Oilers 20

Chiefs quarterback Joe Montana threw three touchdown passes in the second half to give his team a 28–20 win. The Oilers jumped to a 10–0 lead in the first quarter with kicker Al Del Greco's 49-yard field goal and running back Gary Brown's 2-yard touchdown. Then after a scoreless second period, Montana threw a 7-yard touchdown pass to tight end Keith Cash in the third quarter. In the fourth period, Del Greco kicked a 43-yard field goal to give Houston a 13–7 lead. But aided by a 38-yard pass interference penalty, the Chiefs advanced 71 yards to score on wide receiver J. J. Birden's 11-yard touchdown reception from Montana. On the Oilers' next possession, Kansas City defensive lineman Dan Saleaumua recovered a fumble by Houston quarterback Warren Moon, setting up Montana's 18-yard touchdown pass to wide receiver Willie Davis. The Oilers then drove 80 yards to score on wide receiver Ernest Givins' 7-yard touchdown catch, but the Chiefs responded with running back Marcus Allen's game-clinching 21-yard touchdown that capped off a 79-yard drive.

Awards and records
 Haywood Jeffires, Pro Bowl Selection
 Warren Moon, Pro Bowl Selection
 Bruce Mathews, Pro Bowl Selection
 Greg Montgomery, Pro Bowl Selection
 Ray Childress, Pro Bowl Selection
 Mike Munchak, Pro Bowl Selection
 Sean Jones, Pro Bowl Selection
 Webster Slaughter, Pro Bowl Selection

Milestones
The January 16th game marked the last time the Oilers would play a playoff game while playing in Houston. It was not until their third year in Tennessee, which by that time saw the team renamed the Titans, that the team would return to the playoffs; in that season the franchise advanced all the way to the Super Bowl.

Houston itself would not see another NFL playoff game until the Houston Texans, the successors to the Oilers who entered the league in 2002, hosted a Wild Card playoff game at Reliant Stadium in early 2012.

As of the end of the 2020 season, the Oilers/Titans franchise has only seen four division titles since 1993 (2000 in the AFC Central, 2002, 2008, and 2020 in the AFC South). In all four of those seasons, the franchise failed to advance to the Super Bowl, and in two of those years the team was defeated as the AFC's #1 seed. The Titans, however, have made nine playoff appearances since the team moved to Tennessee in 1997 and have won eight playoff games, the most recent in 2020 when they defeated the Ravens in a Divisional matchup. Incidentally, the Tennessee Titans victory against the Patriots in the Wild Card playoff game was the first victory the organization achieved in Foxboro since October 17, 1993, when the organization was still based out of Houston as the Oilers.

See also
List of NFL teams affected by internal conflict

References

External links
 1993 Houston Oilers at Pro-Football-Reference.com

Houston Oilers
Houston Oilers seasons
AFC Central championship seasons
Houston